Heidi Kackur (born 31 October 1978) is a Finnish former football striker. She played for Naisten Liiga club FC United Pietarsaari and Malmö FF and Göteborg FC of Sweden's Damallsvenskan.

Kackur married Henrik Wilson in June 2005 and in October 2005 retired from football to run a clothes shop. In April 2006 Kackur emerged from retirement to play for Swedish lower division club Näsets SK.

She was a member of the Finnish national team, making her debut in October 1999; a 3–1 defeat by Brazil in the 1999 Women's U.S. Cup. At the 2005 European Championship she scored a winner against Denmark that earned Finland's spot in the semi-finals.

References

External links
 
 
 National Team profile 
 Göteborg FC profile 

1978 births
Living people
Finnish women's footballers
Finland women's international footballers
Expatriate women's footballers in Sweden
Damallsvenskan players
FC Rosengård players
BK Häcken FF players
FC United (Jakobstad) players
Kansallinen Liiga players
Finnish expatriate footballers
Women's association football forwards